Kim Clijsters was the defending champion, but did not compete in 2004.

Mary Pierce won the title in 2004.

Seeds
The top two seeds receive a bye into the second round.

Draw

Finals

Top half

Bottom half

References

2004
2004 WTA Tour